Telicatessen is the debut solo album by American hip hop artist and former Sonic Sum member Rob Sonic, released by the Definitive Jux label on September 7, 2004. An instrumental version of the album was released the following year, also by Definitive Jux. The album's title is a portmanteau word combining the terms "television" and "delicatessen".

Music 
All production, lyrics and vocals were by Rob Sonic, with the exception of the verses on "Sniper Picnic" by fellow New York MC Creature and Alaska and Windnbreeze from Definitive Jux labelmates Hangar 18 and backing vocals by M. Sayyid of the group Antipop Consortium. Scratches were performed by Fred Ones from Sonic's former group the Sonic Sum, and by DJ Big Wiz.

Reception 
At Metacritic, which assigns a weighted average score out of 100 to reviews from mainstream critics, Telicatessen received an average score of 74% based on 4 reviews, indicating "generally favorable reviews". Sonic's production was generally praised: a BBC review described the album's sound as "propulsive, hallucinogenic and inspiring," and RapReviews.com described it as "sonically adventurous" without verging into self-indulgence. His lyrics were widely regarded as highly abstract, which critics found to be both a strength ("two-second moments of total clarity bunched together and pouring out") and a weakness ("an endless stream of fleeting ideas").

Popular Media 
The track "Sniper Picnic" was featured on the soundtrack of Activision game Tony Hawk's American Wasteland.

Track listing

Equipment
The following equipment was used in the making of Telicatessen:
ARP Odyssey
ARP Little Brother
Minimoog
Yamaha SK-20
Roland Juno-106
Fender Rhodes Piano Bass
Korg MS-2000
Akai MPC 2000 XL
Technics SL-1200s

Credits
 Vocals, production: Rob Sonic
 Scratching: DJ Big Wiz, Fred Ones
 Additional vocals: Creature, Hangar 18, M. Sayyid
 Executive producer: El-P, Amaechi Uzoigwe
 Mastering: Ken Heitmueller
 Mixing: Fred Ones, Rob Sonic
 Engineering: Fred Ones, Rob Sonic, Ruff-N-Rugged
 Art Direction: Dan Ezra Lang
 Design: Dan Ezra Lang, Rob Sonic
 Illustrations: Dan Ezra Lang

References

External links
 

2004 debut albums
Definitive Jux albums
Rob Sonic albums